Scholfield's Commercial College was a business college in Providence, Rhode Island, during the second half of the 19th century. It is no longer in operation.

History

In 1846, Albert Gallatin Scholfield (1807–1901) moved from Connecticut to Providence. He was a proponent of the double-entry bookkeeping system, but found that most merchants in town used the single-entry system. Sensing an opportunity, in June 1846 he opened Scholfield's Commercial College in downtown Providence. It was the first business school in the city. Eventually the double-entry method became the dominant accounting system in town.

By 1867, the school boasted twelve faculty and an average daily attendance of 650 students. The school taught both men and women, as well as students "young and old."

In the years leading up to World War I, Scholfield's faced increasing competition from the four other commercial colleges in downtown Providence, including Johnson & Wales, Bryant and Stratton (now Bryant University) and Rhode Island Commercial School.

Courses

Bookkeeping was the main course of study at Scholfield's. The school promoted itself as teaching a superior and original method, which they called "Scholfield's Manuscript System of Book-Keeping." This method dispensed with textbooks, and was simultaneously more thorough and faster to learn than other accounting methods. The school offered "special attention" to bookkeeping for the Jewellery industry, which was an important industry in Providence at the time. Further, the school boasted that Scholfield's System would "render the perpetration of fraud or embezzlement by workmen and employees nearly impossible." 

A catalog from 1867 lists courses including surveying; civil engineering; navigation; and penmanship. Also offered was a course on "Common English Studies", which included arithmetic, grammar, geography and other studies. Students could study a basic level of Latin, Greek, French, and German. In 1892 the school offered courses in "shorthand, oil and watercolor painting, and mechanical drawing."

Women studying bookkeeping were allowed to study with the men in the Bookkeeping Department, while other women could enroll in the Ladies Department, which offered instruction in penmanship, Belles-lettres, drawing, and French.

Location
The school was located in the Howard Building, at the corner of Dorrance St. and Westminster St. in downtown Providence. In 1883, the address was given as Paris Hall, 193 Westminster Street. An 1892 listing gives the address as 174 Westminster Street.

Although Bryant College occupied the Howard building in 1863, the two schools are not to be confused. Scholfield's was a competitor of Bryant, and by 1882 Bryant was located in the Hoppin Homestead Building down Westminster Street.

There have been four Howard Buildings on the site. Twice it burned down. The third building, home of Scholfield's, was built 1857 and demolished in 1957 after Hurricane Carol flooded downtown.

The main hall of the Howard building was a huge space, with a capacity to hold 1200 students. The school claimed in 1867 advertisements to be the "largest commercial college in the world."

Alumni
In 1892, Scholfield's claimed an alumni body which included "thousands of successful graduates, scattered all over the United States," including governors, mayors, and "men in all responsible positions of life." Some notable people who studied at Scholfield's include:

 Henry Fletcher (1859–1953), Mayor of Providence 1909-1913
 Albert H. Humes (1867–1947), architect, and one-term mayor of Central Falls
 James H. Rutter (1836–1885), president of the New York Central and Hudson River Railroad Company upon the retirement of William Henry Vanderbilt
 Alexander C. Robertson (1849—1908), president of the Robertson Paper Mills in Montville, and Connecticut state representative and state senator.
 William R. Walker (1830–1905), Rhode Island architect

References

External links
 Scholfield's catalogue from 1867
 Elementary and Practical Treatise on Book-keeping a book by A.G. Scholfield

Defunct private universities and colleges in Rhode Island
History of Providence, Rhode Island
1846 establishments in Rhode Island